Dino Dan is a Canadian television series that was created and is directed by J. J. Johnson. The series premiered on TVOKids in Canada on January 4, 2010 and on Nick Jr. in the United States on October 17, 2010. The show is produced by Sinking Ship Entertainment, in association with TVOKids, Access, Knowledge Network, and SCN. A sequel of the series, Dino Dana, premiered on Amazon Prime on May 26, 2017. The show premiered on Universal Kids on October 6, 2018, three years after Nick Jr.'s rights to the series expired.

Plot
In this series that combines live action with CGI animation, paleontologist-in-training Dan Henderson and his friends take a journey to a modern-day world where dinosaurs roam freely. There, they have adventures, uncover clues about the past and teach children scientific information ranging from new species to dinosaur vocabulary.

Dino Dan: Trek's Adventures
A follow-up season starring Dan's younger brother, Trek, began airing in 2013. Trek, now age ten, is also able to see dinosaurs and spends his time learning about them as his brother did. There are fifteen new dinosaurs from Albertosaurus to Microraptor in this series. Dan did not have time to do his experiments because he has to help his father, so he asks Trek to do them for him. Although Trek becomes the main character for the episodes, Jason Spevack made periodic appearances as Dan throughout Trek's Adventures, though much of the adult cast remained largely unchanged.

Dino Dan cast
Jason Spevack as Dan Henderson
Sydney Kuhne as Angie
Isaac Durnford as Cory Schluter
Jaclyn Forbes as Kami
Allana Harkin as Mom (Melissa Jessica Henderson)
Ricardo Hoyos as Ricardo Sanchez
Trek Buccino as Trek Henderson
Keana Bastidas as Jordan
Sarah Carver as Mrs. Carver
Andrea Martin as Mrs. Hahn
Jayne Eastwood as Dan's grandmother (Ms. Currie)
Mark McKinney as Mr. Drumheller
Jon Dore as Uncle Jack
Jason Hopley as Jim the Zoologist
Sean Cullen as Mr. Paluxy
Pat Thornton as Mr. Schluter, Cory's dad

Trek's Adventures
Trek Buccino as Trek Henderson
Jordyn Negri as Hannah Schluter
Katherine Forrester as Penelope
Colin Petierre as Bobby
Allana Harkin as Mom (Melissa Jessica Henderson)
Jayne Eastwood as Trek's grandmother (Ms. Currie)
Connor Price as Liam, Penelope’s brother
Sarah Carver as Mrs. Carver
Jason Spevack as Dan Henderson
Sean Cullen as Mr. Paluxy
Pat Thornton as Mr. Schluter, Hannah's dad

Episodes

Awards
2009: Nominated for a Gemini Award for Best Preschool-to-4th Grade Program or Series

2009: Won the Shaw Rocket Prize for best independently produced Canadian children's, youth, or family program

2010: Won the Young Artist Award for Most Outstanding Young Ensemble In A TV Series

2015: Dino Dan: Trek's Adventures won the Daytime Emmy Award for Outstanding Pre-School Children's Series

2016: Dino Dan: Trek's Adventures was nominated for the Daytime Emmy Award for Outstanding Pre-School Children's Series

References

External links
 Dino Dan on TVO Kids
 
 Dino Dan: Trek's Adventures on TVO Kids
 

2010s Canadian children's television series
2010 Canadian television series debuts
2019 Canadian television series endings
Canadian children's adventure television series
Canadian children's fantasy television series
Canadian preschool education television series
Canadian television series with live action and animation
TVO original programming
Nick Jr. original programming
Television shows filmed in Toronto
Television series about children
Television series about dinosaurs
2010s preschool education television series
English-language television shows